The Ministry of Communications and Information (MCIT) is a Saudi government ministry was established in 1926 and responsible for the communications and information technology sector in the kingdom. The current minister of Communications and Information is Abdullah Alswaha appointed on 23 April 2017.

History 
The earliest governmental entity to govern the communications and technology sectors was the Directorate of Post, Telephone and Telegraph (PTT)  which was established in Makkah in 1926. in 1931, the telegraph services were provided by the first mobile wireless station imported by the Kingdom, followed by the introduction of telephone service In 1934. In 1953, the telegraph, post, and telephone facilities were reported Ministry of Transport which was established in that year.

The rapid growth of telecommunications technology led to the establishment of the Ministry of Post, Telegraph, and Telephone in 1975 to be responsible for the telecommunications and posts sectors. In 2003, the name of the Ministry of Post, Telegraph, and Telephone was amended to be the Ministry of Communications and Information Technology.

Responsibilities 
The Ministry is mainly responsible for the communications and information technology in the Kingdom where many tasks have been assigned to, including:

 The supervision over the communications and information technology sector and related activities.
 The development of policies that govern the communications and information technology sector.
 Designing plans for the communications and information technology sector.

National Programs 
The Ministry launched and supervised three national programs:

National Digitization Unit: aims at ensuring the development of platforms for a digital society, digital economy and digital homeland.

Yesser: An E-Government Program aims at increasing the productivity and efficiency of the governmental sector by providing the required services and information.

The National Center for Digital Certification (NCDC): This program provides systems for the infrastructure management of the public keys which an essential security technique for e-business, e-trade, and e-government over the internet. this program is currently providing services such as issuing digital certificates, search for digital certificates, checking certificates and validity.

References 



1926 establishments in Saudi Arabia
Communications
Saudi